Broughall is a village in Shropshire, England, situated about 1.5 miles east of Whitchurch,  also the site of the nearest railway station. The village is arranged largely along the A525 road, and is surrounded by green fields.

External links

Villages in Shropshire